Roger W. Wheeler State Beach (formerly and still sometimes referred to as Sand Hill Cove) is a public recreation area covering  on Block Island Sound in the town of Narragansett, Rhode Island. The area offers picnicking, ocean swimming, and a playground and is open seasonally.

History
The beach became state property when it was seized from Tory sympathizers during the American Revolutionary War. Known as Sand Hill Cove, it became Rhode Island's first state beach when 27 acres were transferred to Metropolitan Park Commission in 1929. In 1970, the beach was renamed in honor of Captain Roger W. Wheeler (1907-1969), the founder of the Rhode Island State Life-Saving System.

References

External links
Roger W. Wheeler State Beach Rhode Island Department of Environmental Management Division of Parks & Recreation

State parks of Rhode Island
Beaches of Rhode Island
Protected areas of Washington County, Rhode Island
Protected areas established in 1929
1929 establishments in Rhode Island
Beaches of Washington County, Rhode Island